Marsh Benham is a village in the civil parish of Speen in the county of Berkshire, England. It is situated in the unitary authority of West Berkshire, just west of Newbury.

Amenities
The village has a public house called the 'Red House'. Nearby stands Benham Park.

References

External links

Kennet and Avon Canal
Villages in Berkshire
West Berkshire District